Beaverbrook may refer to:

People
Baron Beaverbrook, of Beaverbrook in the Province of New Brunswick in the Dominion of Canada and of Cherkley in the County of Surrey, a title in the Peerage of the United Kingdom
Max Aitken, 1st Baron Beaverbrook, newspaper publisher and World War II Minister of Aircraft Production
Beaverbrook Newspapers
Maxwell Aitken, 3rd Baron Beaverbrook, British politician and honorary RAF officer

Places
Beaverbrook, Alberta, Canada
Beaverbrook, Ottawa, Canada
Beaver Brook Station, New Brunswick, from which Baron Beaverbrook is named
Beaverbrook, Connecticut, United States

Other uses
Beaverbrooks, a British jeweller
Beaverbrook Art Gallery, in Fredericton, New Brunswick, Canada

See also

Beaver Brook (disambiguation)
Camp Beaverbrook, near Cobb Mountain, in Lake County, California, U.S.
Lord Beaverbrook High School in Calgary, Alberta, Canada